Zuhair Maḥmoud Sa`id Al-Karmi (Arabic:زهير الكرمي‎ (7 December 1921 – 29 November 2009) was a TV presenter, journalist, and author from Tulkarm, Palestine. He was a scientific program presenter on radio stations and Arab television, notably Jordan TV and JRTV. He was known for presenting his documentary series "Al-`Elm Wa Al-Ḥayat" or (Knowledge and Life). He was the founder of Al-Quds University, and was its first chancellor.

Early life and education 
Zuhair Maḥmoud Sa`id Ali Al-Karmi was born on 7 December 1921 in Damascus. He studied primary, middle, and secondary school in Palestine. In 1936, he enrolled in the Arab College in Jerusalem and obtained his secondary school diploma in 1937. He obtained his bachelor's degree in Sciences in 1941 from the American University of Beirut. He was initially a medical student, but his father's assassination in Beirut led to him switching to studying Sciences so he can finish his studies earlier and; therefore, support his siblings.

He moved to Cairo in 1945 to study Arabic scientific terminologies before going to London where he obtained a master's degree in Biology from Imperial College London in 1948.

Al-Karmi is a well-known family in Tulkarm. His father was author Mahmoud Al-Karmi. In addition to his uncles: the poet ʿAbd Al-Kareem Al-Karmi (Abu Salma), the politician ʿAbd Al-Ghani Al-Karmi, the author Aḥmad Shaker Al-Karmi, the linguist Hasan Al-Karmi. His grandfather is the minister Sa`id Al-Karmi. Zuhair Al-Karmi was married and had four sons.

Career 
Al-Karmi worked as a science teacher for three years at Al-Fadhiliya School in Tulkarm before becoming the director of the general examinations department in the Ministry of Education in Jerusalem. He participated with a group of women in founding Al-Jihad Hospital in Tulkarm after his return from London in 1948. He taught English at Al-Kadoorie Institute in Tulkarm.

He was appointed as a school teacher by the Ministry of Education in Kuwait in 1951, before becoming an Inspector of Education, and finally the Director for Inspectors of Education. He supervised sciences curricula more than once. He resigned from his position in education to become the chief executive of Kuwait Oxygen Co. and Kuwait Industrial Gas Co. He contributed to the radio and television in Kuwait by presenting many scientific talk-shows, in addition to founding the Educational Science Museum in Kuwait in 1972.

Al-Karmi found the Arab Institute in Abu Dis close to Jerusalem with the help of a Kuwaiti funding source, the building blocks were placed by the Kuwaiti prince Jaber Al-Sabaḥ and the Jordanian King Hussein Bin Talal. After returning from Kuwait to Palestine in 1979, Al-Karmi founded the College of Science and Technology next to the Arab Institute and took the responsibility of managing and directing the college. 
In 1984, Al-Karmi founded Al-Quds University
after turning the College of Science and Technology into the University College of Science and Technology and adding more colleges. He managed the university, in addition to contributing to its development. The university named one of the big halls after him, as a tribute to him after his death.

Publications 
 ʿOud ʿAla Bed ʾ or (Full Circle), 1993.  
 Maʿalem Sooret Al-ʿAlam Fi Al-Qarn Al-Ḥadi Wa Al-ʿEshreen or (Features of the World's Image in the Twenty-First Century). 
 Al-Kuwait Wa Al-Ma ʾa Fi Al-Qarn Al- Ḥadi Wa Al-ʿEshreen or (Kuwait and Water in the Twenty-First Century). 
 Al-Kuwait Wa Al-Ṣinaʿa Fi Al-Qarn Al- Ḥadi Wa Al-ʿEshreen or (Kuwait and Industrialization in the Twenty-First Century). 
 ʿElm Al-Ḥayat or (Knowledge of Life, Three Volumes). 
 Al-ʿOuloom Al-ʿAmma or (General Sciences, Nine Volumes). 
 Al-ʿElm Wa Mushkelat Al-Ensan Al-Muʿaser, Selselet ʿAlam Al-Maʿarefa or (Education and the Challenges of the Modern Human, World of Knowledge series). 
 He translated for UNESCO The Handbook for Teaching Geography. 
 He revised the translation for two books from the World of Knowledge book series: Al-Kawn Wa Al-Thuqoob Al-Sawdaʾa or (The Universe and Black Holes) by Raʾuf Wasfi and The Ascent of Man or (Erteqaʾa Al-Ensan) by Jacob Bronowski. 
 He translated ‘Humankind’ or (Banu Al-Ensan) by Peter Farb.

Death 
Al-Karmi died on 29 November 2009 at the age of 87.

References 

1921 births
2009 deaths
Palestinian journalists
American University of Beirut alumni
Academic staff of Al-Quds University
Palestinian writers
People from Tulkarm
Academic staff of Palestine Technical University
Syrian emigrants to Mandatory Palestine